Cathedral of St. Thomas located in Hefei, Anhui, China, is a Roman Catholic cathedral serving as the active cathedral for the Roman Catholic Archdiocese of Anqing, China.

References

Cathedrals in China
Roman Catholic churches in China